West Columbia, formerly Brookland, is a city and commuter town in the suburban eastern sections of Lexington County, South Carolina, United States. According to the 2010 census, the population was 14,988, and the 2019 population estimate was 17,998. West Columbia is bordered to the east by Columbia, the state capital, across the Congaree River. It is near Columbia's city center or downtown district as well as the South Carolina State House and the Congaree Vista, known locally as "the Vista." The city is bordered to the south by its sister suburb, Cayce. A small portion of the city borders the town of Lexington to the east. West Columbia is part of the greater Columbia, SC metropolitan statistical area.

History

West Columbia was incorporated in 1894 as "Brookland", but the U.S. Postal Service called the town "New Brookland" since there was another town called Brookland. In 1936, the name was changed to "West Columbia" to emphasize its proximity to Columbia, the capital. Numerous businesses, churches and a high school retain the Brookland and New Brookland names.

The Gervais Street Bridge, Mount Hebron Temperance Hall, New Brookland Historic District, and Saluda Factory Historic District are listed on the National Register of Historic Places.

The 2008 South Carolina Learjet 60 crash occurred just before midnight on September 19, 2008, when a Learjet 60 (registration ) crashed while taking off from Columbia Metropolitan Airport. The weather at the time was cool, dry, and clear. The plane hit runway lights and crashed through the boundary fence, crossing South Carolina Highway 302 (SC 302/Edmund Highway/Airport Boulevard), and coming to rest on an embankment by the side of the highway. No one on the ground was hurt, but four of the six people on the plane (including both pilots) died in the crash, while the other two, Travis Barker (the drummer of Blink-182) and Adam Goldstein (DJ AM of Crazy Town), suffered severe burns. The plane was a charter flight taken by Barker, Goldstein and their entourage following a performance by their musical group TRV$DJAM at a free concert in Five Points earlier that night to Van Nuys, California.

Geography
West Columbia lies to the south and west of the Saluda and Congaree rivers.

According to the United States Census Bureau, the city has a total area of 6.3 square miles (16.3 km2), of which 6.1 square miles (15.7 km2) is land and 0.2 square mile (0.5 km2) (3.18%) is water.

Demographics

2020 census

As of the 2020 United States census, there were 17,416 people, 8,315 households, and 3,764 families residing in the city.

2000 census
As of the census of 2000, there were 13,064 people, 5,968 households, and 3,300 families residing in the city. The population density was 2,150.6 people per square mile (831.0/km2). There were 6,436 housing units at an average density of 1,059.5 per square mile (409.4/km2). The racial makeup of the city was 74.54% White, 19.81% African American, 0.28% Native American, 1.71% Asian, 0.02% Pacific Islander, 2.04% from other races, and 1.61% from two or more races. Hispanic or Latino of any race were 4.66% of the population.

There were 5,968 households, out of which 22.0% had children under the age of 18 living with them, 37.5% were married couples living together, 14.3% had a female householder with no husband present, and 44.7% were non-families. 36.1% of all households were made up of individuals, and 13.0% had someone living alone who was 65 years of age or older. The average household size was 2.13 and the average family size was 2.76.

In the city, the population was spread out, with 18.8% under the age of 18, 10.1% from 18 to 24, 30.0% from 25 to 44, 22.1% from 45 to 64, and 19.0% who were 65 years of age or older. The median age was 39 years. For every 100 females, there were 88.5 males. For every 100 females age 18 and over, there were 86.1 males.

The median income for a household in the city was $30,999, and the median income for a family was $40,253. Males had a median income of $30,033 versus $24,637 for females. The per capita income for the city was $18,135. About 12.8% of families and 16.8% of the population were below the poverty line, including 24.5% of those under age 18 and 11.4% of those age 65 or over. West Columbia is the home of Glenforest School.

Education
West Columbia has a public library, a branch of the Lexington County Public Library.

Notable people
 Duce Staley, former professional football player and football coach
 Hal Jeffcoat, former professional baseball player

See also
 Columbia Metropolitan Airport
 Lexington Medical Center
 Riverbanks Zoo

References

External links
 

History of West Columbia
Lexington School District 2

Cities in South Carolina
Cities in Lexington County, South Carolina
Columbia metropolitan area (South Carolina)